Ronald Harold Cardo (born January 21, 1946) is a former American football player and coach. He was selected by the San Francisco 49ers in the 1971 NFL Draft. Cardo served as the head football coach at his alma mater, the University of Wisconsin–Oshkosh, from 1984 to 1999, compiling a record of 58–98–4.

References

1946 births
Living people
American football running backs
Wisconsin–Oshkosh Titans football coaches
Wisconsin–Oshkosh Titans football players
Wisconsin–River Falls Falcons football coaches
Sportspeople from Milwaukee
Players of American football from Milwaukee